Sainte-Anne-de-Bellevue station is a commuter rail station operated by Exo in Sainte-Anne-de-Bellevue, Quebec, Canada. It is served by  the Vaudreuil–Hudson line.

 on weekdays, 10 of 11 inbound trains and 11 of 12 outbound trains on the line call at this station; the one exception each way is a short turned train. On weekends, all trains (four on Saturday and three on Sunday in each direction) call here.

The station is built on an overpass above Boulevard des Anciens-Combattants (Veterans Road). It has two side platforms; access between them is provided by the sidewalks on either side of Boulevard des Anciens-Combattants, to which the platforms are connected by stairwells covered with distinctive hexagonal canopies. The inbound platform, only about half as long as the outbound platform, is equipped with a small station building.

Bus connections

References

External links
 Sainte-Anne-de-Bellevue Commuter Train Station Information (RTM)
 Sainte-Anne-de-Bellevue Commuter Train Station Schedule (RTM)
 2016 STM System Map

Exo commuter rail stations
Railway stations in Montreal
Sainte-Anne-de-Bellevue, Quebec